Iwase may refer to:

Places
 Iwase Province
 Iwase, Fukushima
 Iwase, Ibaraki
 Iwase District, Fukushima
 Iwase Dam
 Iwase Station

Other uses
 Iwase (surname)